Lord John was a British men's fashion retailer, which opened its first store at 43 Carnaby Street, London, at the corner with Ganton Street, in 1963.

The first Lord John boutique was opened by the brothers Warren, Harold and David Gold in Carnaby Street in 1963, and the choice of name led to litigation from John Stephen who already owned several fashion shops in the street.

In 1967, the store had a three-storey high giant psychedelic mural on the outside of the building, painted by the then largely unknown pop-art collective Doug Binder, Dudley Edwards and David Vaughan (BEV).

Lord John was very popular with mods, and regular customers included the pop groups The Small Faces, The Who, and Brian Jones of the Rolling Stones. It appeared on the cover of the 1967 album This Is My Scene by the Alan Tew orchestra, and was also seen in the 1969 horror film The Haunted House of Horror.

Lord John had eight shops by 1970, and grew to about 30 in the early 1970s, before being acquired by the retail group Raybeck, who sold it to Next in the mid-1980s, when they became Next stores.
Sponsored the lord john Cup in 1977 a chess tournament.

References

Clothing retailers of the United Kingdom
Shops in London
Defunct retail companies of the United Kingdom
Defunct companies based in London
Retail companies established in 1963
1963 establishments in England
1960s in England